LTCI may refer to:

 Long term care insurance, an insurance product
 Lymphocyte T-Cell Immune Modulator, an immune regulating polypeptide
 The ICAO code for Van Ferit Melen Airport in Van, Turkey